Tito Arturo Muñoz (born July 14, 1983) is an American conductor and is Music Director of The Phoenix Symphony. He was previously Music Director of the Opéra national de Lorraine and Orchestre symphonique et lyrique de Nancy in Nancy, France, and Ensemble LPR in New York City, as well as Assistant Conductor of The Cleveland Orchestra, the Cincinnati Symphony Orchestra and the Aspen Music Festival and School.

Biography
Born in Flushing, Queens, Muñoz first studied music in the New York City Public School System, where he took up violin at the Louis Armstrong Middle School. He attended the Music Advancement Program at the Juilliard School as a violin student of Hisako Resnick and later began composition studies with Amanda Harberg.

Muñoz attended the Fiorello H. LaGuardia High School of Music & Art and Performing Arts where he had his first public performance as a conductor, leading Leonard Bernstein's West Side Story. He performed in many ensembles during his high school years, including the InterSchool Orchestras of New York and the New York Youth Symphony. He also attended the Manhattan School of Music Pre-College Division where he studied violin with Jonathan Strasser and composition with Alexander Yagupsky, and received the Richard Kimball Composition Award. During those summers, Muñoz attended the Kinhaven Music School and Apple Hill Center for Chamber Music.

In 1999, Muñoz attended the French Woods Festival of the Performing Arts and was given the opportunity to conduct several ensembles, as well as a fully staged Broadway musical production. He later returned to the Festival in 2001 and 2003 as faculty, where he taught violin and served as staff conductor.

Muñoz began undergraduate studies at the Aaron Copland School of Music, Queens College, as a violin student of Orion String Quartet member Daniel Phillips. As a conductor, he organized many student performances, conducted the school's orchestras on several occasions, and collaborated with faculty in concerto performances.

In the summers of 2004 to 2006, Muñoz attended the Aspen Music Festival and School as a student in the American Academy of Conducting at Aspen where he studied with David Zinman and Murry Sidlin. He also participated in master classes with many notable conductors  including Asher Fisch, George Manahan, David Robertson, Leonard Slatkin and Robert Spano. He won the Festival's 2005 Robert J. Harth Conductor Prize and the 2006 Aspen Conducting Prize and was invited by Zinman to debut with The Cleveland Orchestra at the Blossom Music Center in 2006. He was appointed Assistant Conductor of the festival for the summer of 2007.

After working with Leonard Slatkin, Muñoz was accepted into Slatkin's National Conducting Institute in 2006 and subsequently made his National Symphony Orchestra debut conducting Aaron Copland's Billy the Kid at the Kennedy Center in Washington, D.C.

In May 2006, at the age of 22, Muñoz was appointed Assistant Conductor of the Cincinnati Symphony Orchestra by Paavo Järvi. He made his debut with the orchestra in February 2007 conducting a family concert. That same month, he replaced an ill Krzysztof Penderecki to make his critically acclaimed subscription debut, with violinist Chee-Yun as soloist. He made his Cincinnati Pops debut in March 2007, performing with the Celtic Tenors.

In April 2007, Muñoz was appointed Assistant Conductor of The Cleveland Orchestra by Franz Welser-Möst. He made his European debut with the Orchestre Lyrique de Région Avignon-Provence in December 2007.

Muñoz made his operatic debut in January 2009 with the Opéra national de Lorraine in a production of Manuel Caballero's Los Sobrinos del Capitan Grant. He also made his debut with the Opera's orchestra, l'Orchestre symphonique et lyrique de Nancy, that same month. In December 2010, Muñoz was appointed Music Director of both institutions. In March 2013, Muñoz announced his resignation effective September 2013.

In November 2012, New York City music venue (Le) Poisson Rouge announced the formation of an in-house orchestra named Ensemble LPR and appointed Muñoz as its Music Director. As of fall 2013, Muñoz is no longer director there.

In February 2014, The Phoenix Symphony appointed Muñoz as its 11th Music Director, succeeding Michael Christie.

References

External links 
 
Tito Muñoz biography at The Phoenix Symphony

1983 births
American male conductors (music)
Aspen Music Festival and School alumni
Aspen Music Festival and School faculty
Living people
Queens College, City University of New York alumni
People from Flushing, Queens
Educators from New York City
21st-century American conductors (music)
21st-century American male musicians